= Ghasipura, Bhopal =

Ghasipura
- village
- Location within Madhya Pradesh Location within India
- Coordinates: 23.3511671°N 77.4271665°E
- Country: India
- State: Madhya Pradesh
- District: Bhopal
- Tehsil: Huzur
- Elevation: 482 m (1,581 ft)

Population (2011)
  - Total: 194
- Time zone: UTC+5:30 (IST)
- ISO 3166 code: MP-IN
- 2011 census code: 482391

Ghasipura is a village in the Bhopal district of Madhya Pradesh, India. It is located in the Huzur tehsil and the Phanda block.

== Demographics ==
According to the 2011 census of India, Ghasipura has 36 households. The effective literacy rate (i.e. the literacy rate of population excluding children aged 6 and below) is 65.81%.

Demographics (2011 Census)
	Total	Male	Female
Population	194	102	92
Children aged below 6 years	39	20	19
Scheduled caste	12	6	6
Scheduled tribe	66	34	32
Literates	102	58	44
Workers (all)	80	50	30
Main workers (total)	79	50	29
Main workers: Cultivators	8	8	0
Main workers: Agricultural labourers	0	0	0
Main workers: Household industry workers	0	0	0
Main workers: Other	71	42	29
Marginal workers (total)	1	0	1
Marginal workers: Cultivators	0	0	0
Marginal workers: Agricultural labourers	0	0	0
Marginal workers: Household industry workers	0	0	0
Marginal workers: Others	1	0	1
Non-workers	114	52	62
